Foullon is a French surname. Notable people with the surname include:

Abel Foullon (1513–1563 or 1565), French writer and engineer
Joseph Foullon de Doué (1715–1789), French politician
Rachel Foullon (born 1978), American artist
Raúl Foullon (born 1955), Mexican judoka

See also
Foulon

French-language surnames